The Hudson Valley Shakespeare Festival (HVSF) is a non-profit professional theater company based in Garrison, New York. The festival runs a roughly twelve-week repertory season each year, operating under a large open-air theater tent. Its productions attract a total audience of about 50,000 from the Hudson Valley, New York City, and 40 US states.

HVSF also performs William Shakespeare's works and live theater throughout the tri-state area by touring. The company has limited runs of its most popular programs through its "HVSF On The Road" series and brings student-oriented productions and education programs to about 50,000 elementary, middle, and high school students and teachers each year. HVSF's arts education programs also include training for early-career theater artists by way of its Conservatory Company, professional development for educators, and free audience engagement offerings before and after performances throughout the summer.

History
HVSF was founded by Melissa Stern and Terry O’Brien in September 1987 with an outdoor production of A Midsummer Night's Dream at Manitoga, home of industrial designer Russel Wright, in Garrison, New York. The following year, Boscobel House and Gardens agreed to host HVSF's mainstage season on the estate's expansive grounds, and that summer's production of Shakespeare's As You Like It was performed under a tent overlooking the Hudson River.

In 1994, the festival added a second show to its season and began hands-on, performance-driven education programs within area schools. In 2004, HVSF began to tour productions to middle and high schools. In 2006, HVSF acquired a custom-designed, open-air theater tent with seating for 540.

The Hudson Valley Shakespeare Festival was the subject of a one-hour documentary and two hour film of a performance of Twelfth Night which premiered on the PBS affiliate WNET (Channel 13 in New York City) on September 18, 2008. The program also aired on WLIW (Channel 21 on Long Island).

More than 500,000 patrons have been served since HVSF's first season in 1987. Terry O’Brien led the theater for 27 years, directing more than 30 productions, and stepped down as Artistic Director in December 2013. After a search for his successor, HVSF's Board of Directors appointed Davis McCallum as Artistic Director in May 2014.

In 2016, the festival produced a community-driven production of Thornton Wilder's Our Town with a cast of about 40 citizen actors from the Hudson Valley region, directed by John Christian Plummer.

In 2017, the festival mounted its first new plays: Pride and Prejudice by Kate Hamill (adapted from the novel by Jane Austen), and Lauren Gunderson's The Book of Will.

In 2021, the festival mounted the 2013 James IJames play The Most Spectacularly Lamentable Trial of Miz Martha Washington.

Location
With its plays performed in an open-air theater tent on the grounds of the Boscobel, the festival is known for its backdrop. The stage, a rough patch of dirt that is on the same level as the first few rows of the audience, recedes into lawns with a view of the Hudson River and West Point in the distance. The company uses the vast open space behind the stage as scenery for the plays. According to Ben Brantley of The New York Times, "nature and Shakespeare are the stars" in this festival.

The company received a gift of a land parcel of 50 acres in Garrison in August 2020 and will move to that location permanently in time for the 2022 season. HVSF plans to build a permanent open air structure that will preserve the river views it is famous for at its current Boscobel location.

Recognition
The festival was named among The New York Times' "50 Essential Summer Festivals" in 2016, was Hudson Valley Magazine's 2016 Editors’ Pick for Best Summer Theater, and was nominated for a Drama League Award for its 2015 production of A Midsummer Night's Dream.

It produces classic and new works with an economy of style, focusing on script, actors and audience with the Hudson River and Hudson Highlands as its set and setting. The Wall Street Journal hails it as, "The most purely enjoyable summer Shakespeare festival in America," while The New York Times comments, "If anyone wonders about the future of live theater or asks where the audience is, the answer is 'Under that tent."

It is listed as a "Major Festival" in the book Shakespeare Festivals Around the World by Marcus D. Gregio (Editor), 2004.

Education programs
In addition to its summer productions, the festival sponsors year-round education programs to about 50,000 students and teachers annually. These programs include in-school residencies and theater arts workshops for students, resource workshops for educators, a fall touring production for students in grades K-5, a spring touring production for students in grades 6-12, its annual Shakespeare Summer Camp for ages 8–16, and the Teachers' Shakespeare Institute. HVSF's Conservatory Company, a performance based training program for 6 - 8 early career actors, offers on- and off-stage opportunities to work alongside the festival's acting company.

Plays performed
1987: A Midsummer Night's Dream
1988: As You Like It
1989: Twelfth Night
1990: Much Ado About Nothing
1991: Romeo and Juliet
1992: The Taming of the Shrew
1993: The Merry Wives of Windsor
1994: Macbeth, The Comedy of Errors
1995: The Tempest, The Two Gentlemen of Verona
1996: A Midsummer Night's Dream, Love's Labour's Lost
1997: Tartuffe, As You Like It
1998: A Winter's Tale, Much Ado About Nothing
1999: Titus Andronicus, Twelfth Night
2000: Measure for Measure, Taming of the Shrew
2001: Merchant of Venice, Romeo and Juliet
2002: Henry V, The Comedy of Errors
2003: All's Well That Ends Well, Antony and Cleopatra
2004: Macbeth, The Merry Wives of Windsor
2005: The Tempest, The Two Gentlemen of Verona
2006: A Midsummer Night's Dream, The Rivals
2007: Richard III, As You Like It
2008: Cymbeline, Twelfth Night, Shakespeare Abridged
2009: Pericles, Much Ado About Nothing, Shakespeare Abridged
2010: Troilus and Cressida, The Taming of the Shrew, Bomb-itty of Errors
2011: Hamlet, The Comedy of Errors, Around the World in 80 Days
2012: Love's Labour's Lost, Romeo and Juliet, The 39 Steps
2013: King Lear, All's Well That Ends Well, The Three Musketeers
2014: Othello, Two Gentleman of Verona, The Liar
2015: The Winter's Tale, A Midsummer Night's Dream, The Arabian Nights, An Iliad
2016: As You Like It, Macbeth, Measure for Measure, Our Town, So Please You (devised clown show)
2017: Twelfth Night, Kate Hamill's Pride and Prejudice, The Book of Will, Love's Labour's Lost, The General from America
2018: Richard II , The Taming of the Shrew , The Heart of Robin Hood, Rip Van Winkle; Or, Cut the Old Moon Into Stars, The Sea-Maid’s Music
2019: Much Ado About Nothing, Cymbeline, Cyrano, Into the Woods 
2021: Macbeth, The Most Spectacularly Lamentable Trial of Miz Martha Washington, The Tempest 
2022: Romeo & Juliet; Mr. Burns, A Post-Electric Play; Where We Belong

References

External links

Festivals in New York (state)
Recurring events established in 1987
Shakespeare festivals in the United States